Movie Magazine, formerly titled as Movie Patrol, is a Philippine television showbiz-oriented talk show broadcast by GMA Network. It premiered on February 28, 1987. The show concluded on September 23, 1995. It was replaced by Channel S in its timeslot.

Overview
Originally hosted by Cristy Fermin, Lulubelle Lam and Nap Gutierrez with Mario Hernando as the show's resident film reviewer. They hosted the show from 1987-1993.

In 1992, Fermin started hosting Showbiz Lingo on ABS-CBN with Butch Francisco but continued to host Movie Magazine since the show was not directly in competition with each other.  Nap Gutierrez and Lulubelle Lam left in 1993 and was replaced by Jun Nardo and Dolly Ann Carvajal. Fermin then left Movie Magazine before 1994 ended after ABS-CBN decided to sign her as an exclusive talent. Eugene Asis  came on board to replace her and formed a quartet with remaining hosts Nardo and Hernando until the show went off the air middle of 1995.

Hosts
Final hosts
Jun Nardo (1993–1995)
Dolly Anne Carvajal (1993–1995)
Eugene Asis (1994–1995)

Film reviewer
Mario Hernando

Reporters
Rey Pumaloy
Lhar Santiago

Previous hosts
 Cristy Fermin (1987–1994)
 Nap Gutierrez (1987–1993)
 Lulubelle Lam (1987–1993)

References

External links
 

1987 Philippine television series debuts
1995 Philippine television series endings
English-language television shows
Filipino-language television shows
GMA Network original programming
Philippine television talk shows